S.D.E. (Sports, Drugs & Entertainment) is the second studio album by Harlem rapper Cam'ron. The album was originally titled "The Rough, Rough, Rough Album" and was set for a 1999 release, however the project was pushed back to 2000 and many new songs were recorded. The album was finally released on September 19, 2000, by Epic Records. It features guest appearances from Destiny's Child, Noreaga, Dutch & Spade, Ol' Dirty Bastard, Prodigy, Freekey Zekey, Juelz Santana, and Jim Jones. The album debuted and peaked at no.14, selling 73,000 copies in its first week.

Track listing

Leftover Tracks
"I Don't Like You" 
"It's Too Late"
"Wanna Be a Hustla"

Samples
"Let Me Know" contains a sample of "Heavy Action" by Johnny Pearson.
"What Means the World to You" contains a sample of "Roxanne" by The Police.
"My Hood" interpolates The Temptations' cover of Edwin Starr's song "War".
"Sports, Drugs & Entertainment" contains samples of "That Sweet Woman of Mine" by Leon Haywood and "Things Done Changed" by The Notorious B.I.G.
"Double Up" contains a sample of "Destination Mood" by Norman Connors.
"Losin' Weight" contains a sample of "Don't Leave Me Out Along the Road" by Teddy Pendergrass.
"Fuck You" contains a sample of "Phuck U Symphony" by Millie Jackson.

Charts

References

2000 albums
Cam'ron albums
Albums produced by Dame Grease